Joan Tomàs may refer to:

 Joan Tomàs (footballer) (born 1985), Spanish footballer
 Joan Tomàs (sport shooter) (born 1951), Andorran sport shooter